SS Merchant was an American iron–hulled passenger and package freighter in service between 1862 and 1875. The first iron–hulled merchant ship built on the Great Lakes, she was built in 1862 in Buffalo, New York, by the David Bell shipyard, out of components manufactured in Black Rock, New York, and Philadelphia, Pennsylvania. She was built for James C. and Edwin T. Evans of Buffalo, under whom she carried passengers and freight. Merchant made her maiden voyage in August 1862, sailing from Buffalo to Chicago. Also in 1873, Merchant was sold to the Erie & Western Transportation Company (also known as the "Anchor Line") of Erie, Pennsylvania.

On October 6, 1875, while bound from Chicago for Milwaukee, Wisconsin, with a cargo of 20,000 bushels of corn, 200 barrels of flour and 2,000 bags of flax, she ran aground on Racine Reef off Racine, Wisconsin, due to a navigational error. Her hull punctured, she settled onto the reef. Although it was initially believed that she could be saved, she was abandoned by October 13 and had broken apart by November 1. By 1877, all of her machinery had been recovered.

History

Background
Although Merchant was the first iron-hulled merchant ship built entirely within the Great Lakes, the gunship USS Michigan, built in 1843, in Erie, Pennsylvania, was the first iron-hulled vessel built on the lakes. Beginning in the mid-1840s, Canadian companies began importing iron vessels, prefabricated by shipyards in the United Kingdom. However, it would not be until 1862 that the first iron-hulled merchant ship was built on the Great Lakes. Despite the success of Merchant, wooden vessels remained preferable to iron ones until the 1880s, due to their lower cost and the abundance of timber. In the early 1880s, shipyards around the lakes began construction of iron ships on a relatively large scale; in 1882, Onoko, an iron freighter, temporarily became the largest ship on the lakes. In 1884, the first steel freighters were built on the Great Lakes, and by the 1890s, the majority of ships constructed on the lakes were made of steel.

David Bell, a Scottish immigrant, founded the Bell & McNish engine works in 1845 in Buffalo, New York; the company eventually evolved into the Bell's Steam Engine Works. Bell started constructing ships under his own name in 1858; Merchant was the third ship built by his shipyard.

Design and construction

Merchant (US official number 16332) was built in 1862 in Buffalo, New York, by the shipyard owned by David Bell out of components manufactured in Black Rock, New York by Pratt & Company (some components were also manufactured in Philadelphia, Pennsylvania).  Merchants construction was supervised by J. V. F. Wilson, while the carpentry and joiner work was done by Hitchcock & Gibson.

She had a gross tonnage of 720.66 tons (also given as 720 in old style measurements).

The engine was built by the David Bell Iron Works. She used coal as fuel, becoming the first ship on the Great Lakes to do so.

She cost between ($70,000 equivalent to $ in ), and $75,000 (equivalent to $ in ), although some sources state $90,000 (equivalent to $ in ) to build. Merchant was launched on July 12, 1862, at 5:30 a.m., in order to avoid a large crowd attending the ceremony.

Service history

Merchant was enrolled in Buffalo, which was also her home port, on August 2, 1862. She was built for James C. and Edwin T. Evans (also of Buffalo), under whom she carried passengers and freight. On her maiden voyage in August 1862, Merchant travelled from Buffalo to Chicago, Illinois, under the command of Captain Albert Briggs. Throughout her career, Merchant was involved in multiple accidents and incidents.

The first accident Merchant was involved in occurred in November 1862, when she collided with and damaged the schooner Mazeppa in Buffalo.

While travelling on Lake Michigan in May 1866, Merchant lost one of her crewmen overboard. In May 1867, Merchant became stuck in ice near Buffalo. While bound for Buffalo with a cargo of flour and oats on October 11, 1868, Merchant struck a submerged shipwreck in the Detroit River; she was beached near Malden, Ontario, to prevent her from sinking. She was removed by the wrecking tug Margaret and was repaired in Detroit, Michigan. In October 1869, Merchant was damaged in a collision with an unknown vessel in Buffalo.

In May 1872, while loaded with general merchandise, Merchant struck an obstruction off Bar Point, near Amherstburg, Ontario, and sank. She was raised, and taken to Detroit for repairs. Her passenger cabins were also removed. That same year, she was sold to the Erie & Western Transportation Company (also known as the "Anchor Line") of Erie, Pennsylvania, which became her home port. In September 1873, Merchant rammed the bark City of Painsville in Chicago, severely damaging the latter.

Throughout 1874, Merchant was involved in four accidents. In April, she collided with the bulk freighter Fred Kelly in the Straits of Mackinac. Two months later, she collided with an unknown vessel in Chicago, sustaining $100 (equivalent to $ in ) worth of damage. In July, while loaded with 17,000/18,000 bushels of corn, 7,000 bushels oats, flour and sundries, Merchant ran aground on Racine Reef in fog; she sustained heavy damage, flooded, and sank into  of water. Merchants hull was pumped free of water and arrived in Milwaukee, Wisconsin at 3:00 p.m. on July 31. She was placed in dry dock at the Wolf & Davidson shipyard in Milwaukee, where it was discovered that she had sustained severe damage to her keel and bottom. Her hull sustained $9,500 (equivalent to $ in ) worth of damage, while her cargo was a total loss, resulting in a loss of $25,000 (equivalent to $ in ). Merchant ran aground on Peche Island in Lake St. Clair in November.

Final voyage
On October 6, 1875, while bound from Chicago for Milwaukee, with a cargo of 20,000 bushels of corn, 200 barrels of flour and 2,000 bags of flax, Merchant ran aground at full speed in the middle of Racine Reef off Racine, Wisconsin, at around 11:00 p.m. due to a navigational error. She punctured her hull and sank onto the reef in about fifteen minutes. There were no casualties.

Although Merchant was initially thought to be saveable, she was abandoned by October 13, and had begun to break apart by November 11. By November 3, she had been broken in two by a storm. Merchant was insured for $100,000 (equivalent to $ in ) at the time of her loss. Throughout the summer of 1877, Knapp & Gillen of Racine removed Merchants machinery and a significant amount of scrap metal. In the following years, Merchants wreck was dynamited multiple times.

Merchant today
The remains of Merchant lay forgotten until sometime in the 1990s, when some of her remains were located on Racine Reef. Maritime historian Brendon Baillod dubbed Merchant "one of the most significant, most historic vessels lost in Wisconsin waters".

See also
 Independence (steamboat), first steamboat to run on Lake Superior
 Ontario (steamboat), first steamboat to see active service on Lake Ontario
 Walk-in-the-Water (steamboat), first steamboat to run on Lake Erie, played a pioneering role in steamboat navigation on the Great Lakes.

References

Sources

 
 
 
 
 
 
 
 
 
 
 
 
 
 
 
 
 
 
 
 
 
 
 
 
 
 
 
 
 
 
 

1862 ships
Maritime incidents in 1862
Maritime incidents in 1866
Maritime incidents in 1867
Maritime incidents in 1868
Maritime incidents in 1869
Maritime incidents in 1872
Maritime incidents in 1873
Maritime incidents in 1874
Maritime incidents in 1875
Ships built in Buffalo, New York
Shipwrecks of Lake Michigan
Shipwrecks of the Wisconsin coast
Great Lakes ships
Ships sunk with no fatalities
Racine County, Wisconsin
Package freighters
Wreck diving sites in the United States